Pia Parolin (born 24 August 1965 in Castelfranco Veneto, Italy) is a biologist and tropical ecologist, council member of the Society for Tropical Ecology (gtö) and the Association of Tropical Biology and Conservation (ATBC).

Career
Her scientific work is focussed on the Amazon river and its floodplains and other tropical forest and wetland regions, on questions involving ecology and biological conservation. Her work was based at the Evolutionary Biology in Plön Max-Planck-Institute for Limnology / (Germany) and the National Institute of Amazonian Research - INPA in Manaus (Brazil), and is currently based at the University of Nice Côte d´Azur (France) and the French National Institute for Agricultural Research - INRA (France). Here, she analyzes alternatives to pesticides in biological pest control.

She is also a photographer and book writer. She has published several books.

Publications 
 Parolin, P. (2021): Entwickle deine Fotografie! Wie du deine künstlerischen Ansprüche verwirklichst dpunkt.Verlag, 
 Parolin, P. (2020): Flow – Fotografieren als Glückserlebnis ("Photography as a happiness experience") dpunkt Verlag, 
 Parolin, P. (2020):  100 Photographers’ Words Maison Editrice Baie des Anges.
 Parolin, P. (2019): Un dimanche matin à Nice Maison Editrice Baie des Anges.
 Parolin, P. (2018): Promenade(s) Rencontres éphéméres de passants Maison Editrice Baie des Anges.
 Wittmann F., Schöngart J., Brito J.M., Oliveira Wittmann A., Parolin P., Piedade M.T.F., Junk W.J. & Guillaumet J.-L. (2011): Manual of tree species in central Amazonian white-water floodplains: Taxonomy, Ecology, and Use. Instituto Nacional de Pesquisas da Amazonia - INPA, Universidade Estadual do Amazonas - UEA, Instituto de Desenvolvimento Sustentável Mamirauá - ISDM. Editora Valer, Manaus, Rio de Janeiro, Brazil.
 Junk W.J., Piedade M.T.F., Wittmann F., Schöngart J. & Parolin P. (eds.) (2010): 'Amazonian Floodplain Forests: Ecophysiology, Biodiversity and Sustainable Management'. Ecological Studies, Springer Verlag, Heidelberg.
 Parolin, P. (1997): Auswirkungen periodischer Vernässung und Überflutung auf Phänologie, Photosynthese und Blattphysiologie von Baumarten unterschiedlicher Wachstumsstrategie in zentralamazonischen Überschwemmungsgebieten. Dissertation, Universität Hamburg, 156 pp.

References

External links 
 photographs on piaparolin.com

1965 births
Living people
Italian biologists